Peeradon Chamratsamee (born 15 September 1992) is a Thai professional footballer who plays as a midfielder for Thai League 1 club Buriram United and the Thailand national team.

International career
In 2022, he was called up for the 2022 AFF Championship by Head Coach Alexandré Pölking.

International goals

Honours

International
Thailand
 AFF Championship (1): 2022
 King's Cup: 2017

Club
Muangthong United
 Thai League 1: 2016
 Thai League Cup: 2016

Buriram United
 Thai League 1: 2021-22
 Thai FA Cup: 2021–22
 Thai League Cup: 2021–22

References

External links
 

1992 births
Living people
Peeradon Chamratsamee
Peeradon Chamratsamee
Association football midfielders
Peeradon Chamratsamee
Peeradon Chamratsamee
Peeradon Chamratsamee
Peeradon Chamratsamee
Peeradon Chamratsamee
Peeradon Chamratsamee
Peeradon Chamratsamee
Peeradon Chamratsamee